Armand Lepaffe (18 January 1908 – 9 April 1981) was a Belgian hurdler. He competed in the men's 110 metres hurdles at the 1928 Summer Olympics.

References

1908 births
1981 deaths
Athletes (track and field) at the 1928 Summer Olympics
Belgian male hurdlers
Olympic athletes of Belgium
Place of birth missing